is a former Japanese football player and he is the current manager WE League club of Sanfrecce Hiroshima Regina.

Playing career
Nakamura was born in Osaka Prefecture on May 6, 1974. After graduating from Doshisha University, he joined Japan Football League club Sagan Tosu in 1997. He played as regular defensive midfielder from first season and the club was promoted to new league J2 League from 1999. In 2001, he moved to J2 club Vegalta Sendai. He played as regular defensive midfielder with Celso Vieira or Naoki Chiba in 2001. The club also won the 2nd place in 2001 and was promoted to J1 League from 2002. However the club gained many new player for 2002 season and he could hardly play in the match behind new member Hajime Moriyasu and Silvinho in 2002. He retired end of 2002 season.

Club statistics

References

External links

Vegalta Sendai

1974 births
Living people
Doshisha University alumni
Association football people from Osaka Prefecture
Japanese footballers
J1 League players
J2 League players
Japan Football League (1992–1998) players
Sagan Tosu players
Vegalta Sendai players
Association football midfielders